Ernest Maltravers is a 1920 British silent drama film directed by Jack Denton and starring Cowley Wright, Lillian Hall-Davis and Gordon Hopkirk. It is an adaptation of the 1838 novel Ernest Maltravers by Edward Bulwer-Lytton which had previously been made into an American film Ernest Maltravers in 1914.

Cast
 Cowley Wright - Ernest Maltravers 
 Lillian Hall-Davis - Alice Darvil 
 Gordon Hopkirk - George Legard 
 Norman Partridge - Luke Darvil 
 George Bellamy - Mr Merton 
 Florence Nelson - Mrs Merton 
 Ernest A. Douglas - Lord Vargrave 
 Stella Wood-Sims - Evelyn 
 N. Watt-Phillips - Waters

References

External links

1920 films
British silent feature films
Films directed by Jack Denton
1920s historical drama films
British historical drama films
Films based on British novels
Films based on works by Edward Bulwer-Lytton
Ideal Film Company films
British remakes of American films
British black-and-white films
1920 drama films
1920s English-language films
1920s British films
Silent drama films